Lavin is a municipality in Switzerland.

Lavin may also refer to:

Lavin (surname)
Lavin, Iran, a village in West Azerbaijan Province
Lavin railway station, a Rhaetian Railway station in Lavin, Switzerland
Ben Lavin Nature Reserve, South Africa
Lavin Skee, Marvel Comics character

See also
 Lavi (disambiguation)
 Lavinia (disambiguation)